HMS Shakespeare was an S-class submarine built for the Royal Navy during the Second World War, and part of the Third Group built of that class.  She was built by Vickers-Armstrongs and launched on 8 December 1941.

Design and description

The S-class submarines were designed to patrol the restricted waters of the North Sea and the Mediterranean Sea. The third batch was slightly enlarged and improved over the preceding second batch of the S-class. They displaced  on the surface and  submerged. The S-class submarines had a crew of 48 officers and ratings.

For surface running, the boats were powered by two  diesel engines, each driving one propeller shaft. When submerged each propeller was driven by a  electric motor. They could reach  on the surface and  underwater.

The boats were armed with seven 21 inch (533 mm) torpedo tubes. A half-dozen of these were in the bow and there was one external tube in the stern. They carried six reload torpedoes for the bow tubes for a total of thirteen torpedoes. Twelve mines could be carried in lieu of the internally stowed torpedoes. They were also armed with a 3-inch (76 mm) deck gun. It is uncertain if Shakespeare was completed with a  Oerlikon light AA gun or had one added later. The third-batch S-class boats were fitted with either a Type 129AR or 138 ASDIC system and a Type 291 or 291W early-warning radar.

Service history
She served in the Mediterranean and later in the Eastern Fleet during the Second World War, from December 1944. Whilst serving in the Mediterranean, she sank the Italian sailing vessels Sant' Anna M. and Adelina, the Greek sailing vessel Aghios Konstantinos and two unidentified sailing vessels. On transferral to the Far East, she sank the Japanese merchant cargo ship Unryu Maru.

She was damaged by gunfire and air attack in the Nankauri Strait, Andaman Islands on 3 January 1945, whilst engaged with the Japanese auxiliary minesweeper Wa 1.  Both ships were damaged.  Shakespeare returned to port, but was written off as a constructive total loss.

She was sold on 14 July 1946 and was broken up by Thos. W. Ward, of Briton Ferry.

Notes

References
 
  
 
 
 

 

British S-class submarines (1931)
1941 ships
World War II submarines of the United Kingdom
Ships built in Barrow-in-Furness
Maritime incidents in January 1945